John Mullin may refer to:
Jack Mullin (1913–1999), American pioneer in the field of magnetic tape sound recording
John Mullin (footballer) (born 1975), English association footballer
John Mullin (journalist) (born 1964), British newspaper editor
John W. Mullin (1925–2009), British chemical engineer known for crystallization

See also
John Mullins (disambiguation)